The Duchy of Saxe-Zeitz was a territory of the Holy Roman Empire established in 1656–57 as a secundogeniture of the Electoral Saxon house of House of Wettin. Its capital was Zeitz. The territory fell back to the Wettin electoral line in 1718.

History 
On 20 July 1652, the Saxon elector John George I stipulated in his will that, while the electoral dignity passes to his eldest son John George II, his three younger brothers should receive secundogeniture principalities upon his death. After the elector died on 8 October 1656, his sons concluded the "friend-brotherly main treaty" in the Saxon residence of Dresden on 22 April 1657 and a further treaty in 1663 delineating their territories and sovereign rights definitely. These treaties created three duchies:
 Saxe-Zeitz,
 Saxe-Weissenfels and
 Saxe-Merseburg.

Prince Maurice, the fourth-oldest son received the districts of Zeitz, Naumburg and Haynsburg in the former Bishopric of Naumburg-Zeitz which in 1562 had been secularized in the course of the Protestant Reformation. He also received the city of Schleusingen in 1660, which had once been the residence of the extinct Counts of Henneberg, together with the districts of Suhl and Kühndorf. Duke Maurice resided in the city castle at Naumburg until his new seat at Moritzburg Palace in Zeitz had been completed.

Rulers 
The only rulers were Duke Maurice of Saxe-Zeitz and his son Duke Moritz Wilhelm of Saxe-Zeitz. This line was the first of the three Saxon secundogenitures to die out in 1718, when the only male heir, Prince Christian August, joined the clergy.

Relatives 
 Erdmuthe Dorothea of Saxe-Zeitz (1661–1720), consort of Duke Christian II of Saxe-Merseburg
 Christian August of Saxe-Zeitz (1666–1725), Primate of Hungary and Cardinal
 Frederick Henry, Duke of Saxe-Zeitz-Pegau-Neustadt (1668–1713)
 Dorothea Wilhelmine of Saxe-Zeitz (1691–1743), by marriage Landgravine of Hesse-Kassel

External links 
 Johann Huebner ... Three hundred and thirty-three Genealogical Tables, Table 171

1657 establishments in the Holy Roman Empire
1718 disestablishments in the Holy Roman Empire
States and territories established in 1657
House of Wettin
Former states and territories of Saxony-Anhalt